Wolfgang Gewalt (28 October 1928 – 26 April 2007) was  a German zoologist, author and former director of the Duisburg Zoo.

Biography
After the study of zoology, botany, chemistry and anthropology, his main focus was research of the great bustard. He recorded his observations in the breeding grounds and his experience with hand bred great bustards in several publications.  Moreover, he was chief assistant at the Berlin Zoo. In 1966, he became director of the Duisburg Zoo and landed in the headlines in May 1966 when the white whale Moby Dick strayed into the Rhine. After futile attempts to capture Moby Dick, Wolfgang Gewalt came in for ever more negative criticism. A few newspapers even demanded: "Arrest Wolfgang Gewalt". In June 1966, the whale fortunately succeeded in swimming back to the North Sea.  In 1969, Gewalt led an expedition to Canada and brought back the first beluga to Duisburg. For this he reaped angry criticism. In the same year Wolfgang Gewalt participated in the Encyclopedia Grzimeks Tierleben for which he wrote a contribution on Didelphidae. In 1972, he and his colleagues founded the European Association for Aquatic Mammals at the Dolfinarium Harderwijk in the Netherlands. This is a society for the care of aquatic mammals in human custody. In 1975, he brought five Orinoco river dolphins or toninas back to Duisburg from an expedition to Venezuela. In 1978 one of Wolfgang Gewalt's dreams was fulfilled with the birth of the first bottlenose dolphin in a German Zoo. In 1993, Wolfgang Gewalt retired.

On April 26, 2007 he died from the consequences of an accident in his home.

Selected works
1954 Die großen Trappen
1956 Die Großtrappe
1959 Das Eichörnchen
1964 Bakala
1965 Löwen vor dem zweiten Frühstück
1968 Tiere für dich und mich
1970 Delphine, meine Freunde
1972 Haltung und Zucht von Park- und Ziergeflügel
1973 Mein buntes Paradies
1976 Der Weißwal
1984 50 Jahre Zoo Duisburg
1985 Wie machen die das bloss?
1986 Auf den Spuren der Wale
1993 Wale und Delphine
1995 Liebe und Geburt im Zoo, Lübbe, Bergisch Gladbach

External links

20th-century German zoologists
1928 births
2007 deaths
Französisches Gymnasium Berlin alumni